Graphenated carbon nanotubes are a relatively new hybrid that combines graphitic foliates grown along the sidewalls of multiwalled or bamboo style carbon nanotubes (CNTs). Yu et al. reported on "chemically bonded graphene leaves" growing along the sidewalls of CNTs. Stoner et al. described these structures as "graphenated CNTs" and reported in their use for enhanced supercapacitor performance. Hsu et al. further reported on similar structures formed on carbon fiber paper, also for use in supercapacitor applications. Pham et al.  also reported a similar structure, namely "graphene-carbon nanotube hybrids", grown directly onto carbon fiber paper to form an integrated, binder free, high surface area conductive catalyst support for Proton Exchange Membrane Fuel Cells electrode applications with enhanced performance and durability. The foliate density can vary as a function of deposition conditions (e.g. temperature and time) with their structure ranging from few layers of graphene (< 10) to thicker, more graphite-like.

The fundamental advantage of an integrated graphene-CNT structure is the high surface area three-dimensional framework of the CNTs coupled with the high edge density of graphene. Graphene edges provide significantly higher charge density and reactivity than the basal plane, but they are difficult to arrange in a three-dimensional, high volume-density geometry. CNTs are readily aligned in a high density geometry (i.e., a vertically aligned forest) but lack high charge density surfaces—the sidewalls of the CNTs are similar to the basal plane of graphene and exhibit low charge density except where edge defects exist. Depositing a high density of graphene foliates along the length of aligned CNTs can significantly increase the total charge capacity per unit of nominal area as compared to other carbon nanostructures.

References 

Carbon nanotubes